Quixote is a software framework for developing web applications in Python. Quixote "is based on a simple, flexible design, making it possible to write applications quickly and to benefit from the wide range of available third-party Python modules".

A Quixote application is typically a Python package, a collection of modules grouped into a single directory tree. Quixote then maps a URL to a function or method inside the Python package; the function is then called with the contents of the HTTP request, and the results are returned to the client.

See also 

 Comparison of web frameworks

References

External links

Python (programming language) web frameworks